Provincial elections were held in Sindh, Pakistan along with general elections, for National Assembly and all Provincial Assemblies, on 29th October, 1990.

List of members of the 9th Provincial Assembly of Sindh 
Tenure of the 9th provincial assembly of Sindh was from 4th November, 1990 till 19th July 1993.

References 

Provincial Assembly of Sindh
Politics of Sindh